Scott's Food & Pharmacy was a supermarket chain in the Fort Wayne, Indiana market. The company was once a wholly owned subsidiary of SuperValu, but was acquired by The Kroger Co. in 2007.  At the time of its purchase by Kroger, the chain had 18 locations.  By late 2014, that number had dwindled to one location as a result of stores being closed or rebranded under the Kroger banner. However, the company shut down in 2016, due to the final store rebranding to Kroger.

History
Donald G. Scott opened his first store in 1954. In 1963, Scott met William Reitz and the two merged their companies in 1979. In 1991, Scott's was acquired by SuperValu, Inc., who later renamed it Scott's Food & Pharmacy. It soon grew with a few more stores under SuperValu. Scott's was sold to The Kroger Company in 2007 for $33 million. In July 2007, Kroger announced that they would be closing five stores in Indiana. Donald Scott died in 2008. Kroger currently operates Scott's under the Central division, which includes Owen's Market and Pay Less Food Markets. The final Scott's store located in Fort Wayne, rebranded to Kroger in 2016.

See also
 Kroger
 SuperValu

References

External links
 Kroger

Defunct supermarkets of the United States
SuperValu (United States)
Kroger
Companies based in Fort Wayne, Indiana
Defunct companies based in Indiana
Retail companies established in 1954
Retail companies disestablished in 2016
1954 establishments in Indiana
2016 disestablishments in Indiana
1991 mergers and acquisitions
2007 mergers and acquisitions